Marlow Rugby Union Football Club is an English Rugby Union club. That was formed in 1947. Marlow Rugby Club play at Riverwoods Drive, which is located in Marlow, Buckinghamshire. It currently has 4 senior sides, ladies, Colts, full Youth (most age groups run 2 sides) and Mini Section. Marlow IS to be the birthplace of Mini Rugby in English, and runs one of the oldest Mini Tournaments, now in its 44th year.

History

1912 - 1946

Officially the Club was formed at a meeting held at the Chequers Hotel in the High Street, Marlow on Tuesday 3 February 1947. However, a rugby match was played on 8 February 1913 on Crown Meadow against High Wycombe RFC and (not for the first time), Marlow triumphed by 13pts to nil.

One of the players who took part in this game, a Dr. G Berkeley Wills wrote to the Club in 1964 to confirm the events of that day. He wrote :- 'At the end of 1912 one or two of us who had been at schools which played Rugger thought it might be amusing to get together if possible a team to show Marlow - which was then prominent at Soccer - what 'The handling game' was like.

When it came to it we could only find four or five people who had played the game before, nevertheless we persuaded others to make up a side under instruction. We hired Crown Meadow, (this was before it became Riley Recreation Ground) erected goal posts, marked out the pitch and had several intensive practices to try and instil some basic principles and to form a team.

We then challenged High Wycombe RFC to a match, the result of which I think surprised us all. The score of two goals and a try was a fair indication of the run of the play. Quite a large crowd watched the game and yelled their surprise and approved whenever a tackle was made - especially when a three quarter was downed and hurled over the touch line. This was a strange and exciting game indeed !

This was the only match played - other interests intervened and in the following year of course came the Great War. Nevertheless, it was a famous victory!'

1947-to present
Dick Simpson, who was in attendance Tuesday 3 February 1947, at the Chequers Hotel, recalled,

"It was not long after the war that some rugby enthusiasts in Marlow led by farmer John White started to talk about the possibility of forming a local club. After a lot of jaw, principally in the bar of the Chequers on Saturday nights and Sunday mornings, it was agreed to hold an inaugural meeting. As a former player I was asked to help, but as I was an old member of Thames Valley (now Maidenhead), I thought it right to find out first if they were contemplating starting up again. A phone call to Roy Bonberry at Thames Valley gave the news that they would not be operating in 1947."

"I printed a notice which was circulated to all the youth of the town and the first meeting took place at the Hotel. The chair was taken by 'Gerry' Mason who was then the landlord of the Crown Hotel and who had played (about seven stone lighter then) for the Bank of England."

There wasn't much money about, just enough to buy the meeting a drink. Gerry then put the following question to the meeting "Do you want a Rugby Club in Marlow?". The meeting was unanimously in favour of a Club being formed.'

'Fran' Francis, Marlow's first captain remembers that the meeting passed the following resolutions :-

1. The Marlow Rugby Union Football Club should be formed.

2. A provisional subscription of 5/- (five shillings) be paid by each member.

3. An account be opened at the National Provincial Bank.

4. Trial games would be held and that some matches be arranged for what remained of the 1947-48 season.

In that very first season five matches were played, four by the first XV and one by the 'A' XV. All first XV games played were won with a creditable points record of 62 points for, 18 points against. This was a remarkable achievement considering that very few of players who played in that first season had played the game before. It also shows how quickly the popularity of rugby spread as the Club was able to get two sides out at the end of April.

The first match of the newly formed Club was against Old Wycombensians' who had challenged Marlow to raise a side to play them and this historic game was played on the Royal Grammar School ground at High Wycombe. The result was the same as the match in 1913, a win for Marlow. The Club's first official fixture however was on 13 March 1947 away against London Airport. The report of that opening game appeared in the Bucks Free Press the following week. The other remaining two fixtures that season were against two guest sides at home. These matches were played on Home Meadow at Sir William Borlase's Grammar School and teas were served at the Cross Keys pub afterwards.

The immediate problem facing members in the late 1940s was the acquisition of permanent playing and changing facilities. At first the two did not necessarily go together. The Club still continued to use the George and Dragon to change in, but the pitches changed more frequently than the weather. The Club used Sir William Borlase's Grammar School or Royal Grammar School pitches, then for a brief spell a pitch was hired down Fieldhouse Lane where the industrial estate now is. After which a pitch near Pound Lane was used. Players frequently changed at home, played rugby and then returned home to wash afterwards.

Players in that 1947 season included Eric Page, a lightning fast winger who scored a prodigious number of tries for the Club. On the other wing was George Wooster, landlord of the Cross Keys pub and, like his fictional relation, was quite a character in his own right. Phil Mason was, along with Norman Jameson in the back row, a devastating tackler. His time keeping for away matches on occasions left a lot to be desired as startled pedestrians would confirm. Not wanting to be late for an away game, he would often arrive in his ancient Rover outside the Chequers via the pavement in front of what was then the Post Office.

The first AGM was held on 27 April 1948 at the Chequers Hotel. The Club now had sixty members of whom 42 were players. The 1st XV had almost a full fixture list for the 1948 - 49 season although difficulties were experienced in getting a full list for the 'A' XV.

The opening fixture of the 1948 season was away at R.E.M.E Aborfield where the team triumphed by 6 pts to 3 pts. In the 1947-8 season the Club was affiliated to the Oxfordshire Rugby Union and it was only on 1 September 1948 did the Club become affiliated to Rugby Football Union. In those days you could be affiliated to more than one county, so by December 1951, Marlow was affiliated to Bucks, Berks, Oxon as well as the Rugby Football Union.

The Club's first full season went with a swing, the 1st XV won 17 out of the 24 games played, with one drawn match and six losses. Twice as many points were scored as were conceded with the final tally being 207 points for, 104 points against. The second XV played 16 matches winning seven, losing eight with one draw.

At the second AGM on 16 August 1949, Brigadier R.H.R Steward was elected as the Club's first President and the Club had a bank balance at the end of the season of £29 4s 4d. It was decided at this meeting that the Rugby Club should join with the newly formed Marlow Sports Club in Pound Lane.

The decision was regarded by some with trepidation, as theirs was the view that the Club should remain independent; however, the decision had been made and Marlow at last had permanent if not independent headquarters.

Like all amateur organisations Marlow Rugby Club was, and still is, dependent on subscriptions and fund raising exercises from the membership. The moneys raised from subscriptions alone were not sufficient to cover the running costs of the Club and at the third AGM on 22 May 1950 it was decided that the rules should be changed and that 'a match fee of one shilling and sixpence,1/6, (8p in 2006 money) per match was to be paid by all members taking part in a game.'

For the next thirteen years the Rugby Club was a member of the Marlow Sports Club sharing facilities with the Hockey and Cricket Clubs. During this period the club gradually expanded and became quite a prominent feature of Marlow sporting life. Conditions at the Sports Club were far from ideal both in the relationships with the various sporting sections and in the facilities provided. However, Marlow found here a chance to function regularly as a Club without the difficulties, which it had experienced in its first years.

Rugby in these early years was by today's standards primitive, but the pioneering spirit shown by the early members was no more obvious than when it was reported that the changing accommodation at the Sports Club had been delayed because of the bad weather. Although the changing rooms where now ready all they lacked was a cess-pit!

The pitch at Pound Lane was lent to the Club from a Farmer White who owned a field next to the Marlow Sports Club. There were immediate difficulties with the pitch, two trees had to be removed but the prime obstacle was 'the hump', this was a pronounced mound which ran across the width of the pitch. Marlow used 'the hump' to great effect as a natural defence for six years before it was removed. Whole three-quarter lines are said to have fallen over the first time they mounted an attack and movements were often broken-up when a player looked to pass as he ran onto it.

Throughout this period traveling away presented difficulties as there were very few cars and in 1952-3 the club hired 19 coaches from Taylor's Garages. The after game sociability, which is apparent at Marlow, owes a lot to the long sessions enforced by coach travel in these formative years.

Marlow had black shirts at first, because with clothing rationed, any available shirt was produced and dyed black to obtain uniformity of colour. In the season 1949-50 the Club changed the style to match the hooped playing shirts of Sir William Borlase's Grammar School.

This design did not last long and in 1951 the Club reverted to the all black shirt. At AGMs in 1952 and 1954 a proposal to change the design of the jersey was defeated on both occasions, however in 1956 a compromise was reached and a black shirt with a narrow white band was adopted. In our 50th anniversary season in 1997 a gold band was added to the design.

The growth of the Club was such that in 1958 a more permanent 2nd pitch was required. Up to that point the 1st XV played at the Sports Club, but if the 'A' XV was at home a pitch still had to be borrowed in the town somewhere. Home Meadow at Borlase school, a pitch along Dedmere Road, Alder Meadow in Pound Lane were just some of the places were the 'A's had to play their rugby. No wonder the Club formed a Nomads XV later on in its history!

Eventually a pitch was acquired in Gossmore Lane. The players still had to change in Pound Lane, but unlike the pitch at the Sports Club, the players did not have to use a shovel to clear to relics of the cattle that farmer White had put out to graze on the 1st team pitch during the week!

However, there was one task that had to be completed before any rugby could take place, and that was to collect the posts from Alistair Findlay's house in Lock Road. 'A' team players did keep fit, as after the game the posts had to be taken down and returned to Alistair's house, and then it was a dash to the Sports Club pavilion to see if there was any hot water left. Occasionally they made it before the hockey players, but regrettably this didn't happen very often.

In the 1960-61 season it became clear that the Rugby Club was outgrowing the facilities at the Sports Club, and when they were unsuccessful in negotiating with a Mr. Saunt who owned a piece of ground flanking Pound Lane to use as an additional pitch, the Club decided to look for a larger home.

At a Special General Meeting on Tuesday, 11 September 1962 at the Chequers Hotel, Richard Welsford and a Mr. Wedlake outlined the negotiations that had taken place with regard to 21 acres of land down by the river. Ten acres of this land were owned by a farmer William Morris, who at that time owned Town Farm at the back of Borlase School and the other eleven were owned by Marlow Urban District Council.

The minutes of that night record that, after discussion, the following motion was put to the meeting and approved. "That this Special General Meeting of The Marlow Rugby Club empowers the General Committee to act on its behalf to negotiate and complete a lease on land situated at Riverwoods Drive. They are to obtain the best possible terms with a maximum rental of £300 per annum to be offered". This set the wheels in motion, which enabled Marlow to move to its current location.

A 21-year lease at £300 per annum was agreed with Mr. Morris, and a rolling one-year lease at £15 per annum was agreed with Marlow UDC. The land rented from Mr. Morris was on the higher ground at Riverwoods and it was on this land that it was decided to build Marlow's Clubhouse. In March 1963 work commenced. Whilst the building work was going on the New Ground Committee was still working feverishly in trying to obtain funds to help pay for the Clubhouse.

To show how much faith the Club had in its own ability to raise the necessary money, the Club's bank balance at 31 December 1962 stood at £101 4s 2d, and the cost of building the Club and preparing the pitches in readiness for the start of the 1963-64 season was £6,400.

At the end of May the Clubhouse appeal fund stood at £700. Marlow wrote to a variety of organisations to seek financial assistance in the form of loans. In the end Thomas Wethereds, who were the town brewery company and Middlesex County Rugby Football Union agreed to loan the Club £2500 each over a period of 10 years. The Club's application to the RFU was turned down as they themselves were short of money!

In September 1963 the Club started the season in its new home. By this time Marlow was running 5 sides and the future was looking bright for all those people who had put so much hard work into moving the Rugby Club to Riverwoods.

The first home game at Riverwoods was between Marlow 'A' XV captained by Geoff Spinks against Newbury 2nds. The result was a win for Marlow by 25 pts to 8 pts. On 2 October, the Club was officially opened by Mr. A. G. Butler, President of the RFU . The 1st XV played an invitation game against a combined Bucks and Berks XV. The side put up a worthy performance but the visitors proved too strong and ran out winners by 18pts to 6pts.

To help pay for the clubhouse, Marlow embarked on a variety of fund raising ventures. One of the most successful was the annual Donkey Derby run by Jim Platt, (of Platts Garage in Quoiting Square, Marlow), and his helpers. Special buses were laid on to transport the 'punters' from all points in Marlow. Weekly football draws were run by Colin 'The Swindle' Trundell. Gilbert North collected for the East Berks Sportsman's Association (EBSA) and the Club erected a shed at the end of the drive to collect waste paper. Three legged and wheelbarrow pub crawls were organised and with more than 20 pubs at that time in Marlow, only the strongest and the soberest completed the course. The Club organised a Pantomime much to the amazement and amusement of the membership. There was nothing that the Fund Raising and Social committees would not do well almost anything.

The effect of the new improved facilities was immediate. The playing strength of the Club increased from three sides to as many as eight as new players were attracted by the superb clubhouse. Less than two years after moving to Riverwoods it was found necessary to expand the Club further, a shower room and new changing rooms were built, the kitchen and bar extended and a new pitch added. Marlow benefited from this as a number of first-class players who have joined the Club admit to having gone to other Clubs, seen their clubhouses and immediately joined Marlow. These additions to the Riverwoods facilities attracted more players and as a result more income.

By 1967 the original £6,400 loan was reduced to under £5,000 due to the fundraising efforts of the membership. The Club was always looking for novel ways to raise money and in 1969, the 200 Club was formed which as the name suggests was limited to 200 people. It cost £25 a year to join and there were monthly prizes of £100 and every six months there was a draw for £500. In 1969 that was a substantial sum of money, as is shown by the fact that the alternative choice for the lucky winner was a Morris Mini car which was then selling at £499. 19s. 11d.

Fund raising brought in regular income but Bill Murphy, then President of the Club, had bigger and better plans for raising money. So on 21 July 1972, Marlow held the first of many Bar-B-Q's at Riverwoods for a few friends - 1500 to be exact. Through his extensive contacts Bill persuaded many of his Irish friends to attend - people like Terry Wogan, Willie John McBride and Fergus Slattery all were in attendance at a Marlow Bar-B-Q sometime or other.

In October of that year Marlow started a Sunday morning activity that was to change the lives of young boys and their parents who attended that inaugural meeting forever - Mini Rugby was born at Riverwoods.

The training lights were upgraded during the season and Marlow was now running between eight and nine sides on a Saturday. Not content with having a superb set of lights to train under, in 1973, Marlow knowing that improved facilities were the only way to stay as the top side in the area, decided that another set of lights were required. By the time the players returned for the start of the season, floodlights had been erected around the 1st team pitch. At that time Marlow was the first junior Club and certainly one of the very few Clubs in the Country to offer this facility to its playing membership.

On a Thursday night in November, the Club played against an International XV raised by International Referee Mike Titcomb to officially open the lights. It would be no exaggeration to say that the team he brought down to Marlow that night consisted of probably the greatest collection of International talent that was around in Britain at that time:

John Dawes, JPR Williams, Geoff Evans, John Taylor, (members of the victorious 1971 British Lions team in New Zealand), Mike Burton, Roger Hosen, Bill Gittings were just some of the glittering array of talented players on display that night. The final score didn't matter (26pts - 8pts to the visitors by the way). What did matter was that players of this calibre were prepared to give up an evening, and for many of them a long night and early morning, to come and help a Club such as Marlow celebrate the addition of facilities that would help to advance the cause of Rugby

A year later was the formation of a team that was to extend rugby players careers (and their waist lines) even further - a Vets team - The Stragglers was started at Marlow. Charlie Child was the first Captain and Past President David Sumpter was his Vice-Captain. With an entry age of 35, many players who were nearing the end of their playing days were able to enjoy a more sedate, less intensive game against teams of similar ages and abilities. Vets teams took on an identity of their own, with teams calling themselves names such as Chiltern 100s, Beaconsfield Boars, Wycombe Bodgers, Feltham Ponderers and Camberley Gin and Tonics. Vets rugby became well established around the country and such was the attraction of this type of rugby that in April 1975, the Stragglers played a team consisting of the Fleet Street Rugby Winters under floodlights at Riverwoods. It was probably the only time that players could get their own back for what may have been written about them!

The Club now had all the pieces of the jigsaw in place to attract players who moved into the Thames Valley area and were looking to join a progressive rugby club. The number of sides that the Club ran grew in the next five years to seven sides every Saturday, and with Mini players now becoming Youth players, Sunday mornings saw upwards of over 140 boys between seven and seventeen enjoying first class coaching to prepare them for the senior game.

Marlow because of its accessibility to the M4 and M40 motorways soon became popular as a training venue for International training sides from as far away places as Argentina to Russia during this period. Marlow's population was still growing and the outskirts of Greater Marlow spread to embrace Marlow Bottom during this time. Players from first class clubs in London, were attracted to this beautiful Thames side setting and naturally Riverwoods was their first port of call. 1980 Being Champions of 6 Counties saw Marlow drawn against Bath (included 3 current Internationals) to become the 1st Junior club to reach the last 32 in the John Player Cup on 3 occasions (Played Rosslyn Park 1972 and 1975) The team acquitted themselves so well on the day, that Jack Rowell (later to become England Manager) brought the Bath team to play a pre season warm up game at Marlow under lights.

1985, saw Marlow realise one prime ambition - to become owners of their own ground. For many years leading up to this time, the Club had been in negotiations with Willie Morris, the farmer who owned approximately half of the land that was Riverwoods. On his death, his sons agreed to sell this land to the Club and after lengthy discussions with his family, in September 1985, Marlow bought the freehold to this parcel of land and at long last the Club could said to be at last masters of their own destiny.

Marlow has never forgotten that it has always been an integral part of the town and county. A game against the 'Anti-Assassins' in 1986 raised over £500 for Stoke Mandeville Hospital, and many other functions have been held to help raise money for other worthy causes.

The World Cup held in England in 1991 was yet another opportunity for Marlow to show that when it comes to organising events, not many Clubs can hold a candle to us. A celebration dinner was held in September for the Romanian National side. This coincided with the arrival of the World Cup Rugby ball at Marlow. The ball was brought into the dinner by members of Marlow's Youth team who had carried the ball on this leg of the journey around the country before its arrival at Twickenham in time for the opening World Cup match between England and New Zealand.

The 50th Anniversary October 1997 dinner with attendance by guests such as Peter Brooks (President of the RFU) Will Carling (Former England skipper and British Lions) and former Marlow player Paul Burnell (Scotland and British Lions) was a further example of the esteem Marlow is held in Rugby

If there is one thing that sums up Marlow Rugby Club, it is the phrase 'The only constant is change'. As we move into the next decades of the Club's existence, further changes are proposed to keep Marlow as the Club of choice for any rugby player moving into the Thames Valley as we have never been a Club to rest on our laurels.

Home ground
Riverwoods Drive.

Current standings

Current squad

Internationally capped players
  Paul Burnell
  Derek White
  Matt Dawson
  Nick Kennedy
  Chris Sheasby
  Jaska Lovreta
  Michael Lunjevich
  Ladia Vondrasek

Club Honours
Southern Counties champions: 1989–90
South West 2 East champions: 2001–02
Southern Counties (north v south) promotion playoff winners: 2008–09
Southern Counties North champions: 2016–17

Head coaches

References

External links
 Official site
 Facebook Page

Rugby clubs established in 1947
Rugby union in Buckinghamshire
English rugby union teams
1947 establishments in England